Michel Guiomar (3 November 1921 – 6 January 2013) was a French writer and philosopher who was a Professor Emeritus of Aesthetics at the University of Paris IV.

Guiomar was Director of Research in Philosophy and Aesthetics at CNRS before taking the chair in aesthetics at the University.

Works
 Inconscient et imaginaire dans Le Grand Meaulnes, 1964.
 Principes d'une esthétique de la mort, les modes de présences, les présences immédiates, le seuil de l'au-delà, 1967.
 Le masque et le fantasme; l'imagination de la matière sonore dans la pensée musicale de Berlioz, 1970.
 Imaginaire et utopie: études berlioziennes et wagnériennes, 1976.
 Trois paysages du Rivage des Syrtes, 1982
 Miroirs de Ténèbres: images et reflets du double démoniaque, 1984
 Vol. I : Julien Gracq: Argol et les rivages de la nuit
V ol. II : Georges Bernanos: Sous le soleil de Satan, ou, les ténèbres de Dieu
 Vol. III : Henri Bosco: L'Antiquaire: Nocturnal à l'usage des veilleurs et des ombres

References

1921 births
2013 deaths
20th-century French philosophers
Philosophers of art
French writers about music
French male non-fiction writers
Research directors of the French National Centre for Scientific Research